Party 'Til You're Broke is the ninth studio album by funk band Rufus, released on the MCA Records label in 1981. Party 'Til You're Broke which was the band's second album not to be fronted by Chaka Khan reached #24 on Billboards R&B Albums chart and #73 on Pop and included the singles "Tonight We Love" (US R&B #18, US Dance #64) and "Hold on to a Friend" (US R&B #56), making Party 'Til You're Broke the most successful Khan-less album from Rufus.

Following  Party 'Til You're Broke and Khan's second solo album Naughty, which was released in 1980, Rufus reunited with Khan again in 1981 for the recording of Camouflage which was to be their final full-length studio album together.

Track listing

Personnel
 Tony Maiden - bass guitar, guitar, vocals
 Kevin Murphy - keyboards, vocals
 Bobby Watson - bass guitar
 David "Hawk" Wolinski - keyboards, vocals
 John Robinson - drums, keyboards, vocals
Louis Johnson played Bass on "Tonight We Love"
Sources -album credits

Production
Rufus, John Stronach - record producers

ChartsAlbumSingles'''

References

External linksParty 'Til You're Broke'' at Discogs

1981 albums
Rufus (band) albums
MCA Records albums